Raboteau is a surname. Notable people with the surname include: 

Albert J. Raboteau (1943–2021), American theologian
Emily Raboteau (born 1976), American writer